Alexander Gradon (circa 1666 – May 1739), also spelt Graydon, was an Irish politician.

Gradon represented Naas in the Irish House of Commons between 1703 and 1711. He then sat for Harristown from 1713 to 1714, and again from 1715 to 1727.

References

Year of birth unknown
1739 deaths
Irish MPs 1703–1713
Irish MPs 1713–1714
Irish MPs 1715–1727
Politicians from County Kildare
Members of the Parliament of Ireland (pre-1801) for County Kildare constituencies
Year of birth uncertain